is a former Japanese football player. She played for Japan national team.

Club career
Kadohara was born on 25 May 1970. She played for Matsushita Electric Panasonic Bambina. She was selected Best Eleven in 1994.

National team career
In December 1993, Kadohara was selected Japan national team for 1993 AFC Championship. At this competition, on 4 December, she debuted against Chinese Taipei. She also played at 1994 Asian Games, 1995 AFC Championship. She was a member of Japan for 1995 World Cup and 1996 Summer Olympics. She played 12 games and scored 1 goal for Japan until 1996.

National team statistics

References

External links
 

1970 births
Living people
Place of birth missing (living people)
Japanese women's footballers
Japan women's international footballers
Nadeshiko League players
Speranza Osaka-Takatsuki players
1995 FIFA Women's World Cup players
Olympic footballers of Japan
Footballers at the 1996 Summer Olympics
Women's association football midfielders
Asian Games medalists in football
Asian Games silver medalists for Japan
Footballers at the 1994 Asian Games
Medalists at the 1994 Asian Games